Sodium-dependent phosphate transport protein 2C is a protein that in humans is encoded by the SLC34A3 gene.

Function 

SLC34A3 contributes to the maintenance of inorganic phosphate concentration at the kidney.

Interactions 

SLC34A3 has been shown to interact with PDZK1.

Clinical Correlation
A mutation in the SLC34A3 gene has been known to cause the autosomal recessive condition hereditary hypophophatemic rickets with hypercalciuria. This gene is correlated closely with SLC34A1, an analogue sodium phosphate cotransporter protein. Symptoms include renal phosphate wasting in addition to increase levels of 1,25-dihydroxyvitamin D (yields the hypercalcuria).

See also

References

Further reading 

 
 
 
 

Solute carrier family